Ophiotaenia is a genus of tapeworms in the Proteocephalidae family.

Species
 Ophiotaenia ranae

References

Cestoda genera